Dinggyê County or Dinjie County or Tingche County or Tingkye County (Standard Tibetan:) is a county of the Xigazê in the Tibet Autonomous Region, bordering Nepal's Sankhuwasabha and Taplejung Districts to the south and India's Sikkim state to the southeast. Jin Co and Duolo Co are located in this county.

It is one of the four counties that comprise the Qomolangma National Nature Preserve (Dinggyê, Tingri, Nyalam, and Kyirong).

Towns and townships
 Gyangkar Town
 Ri'og Town
 Chentang Town
 Gojag Township
 Sar Township
 Kyungzê Township
 Dinggyê Township
 Qab Township
 Dozhag Township
 Tashi Nang Township

References

External links
 Dinggyê County Annals

Counties of Tibet
Shigatse